Leros Municipal Airport (Greek: Δημοτικός Αερολιμένας Λέρου, Dimotikós Aeroliménas Lérou)  is an airport serving the island of Leros in Greece. It is also known as Leros Public Airport or Leros Airport. The airport began operations in 1984.
The airport is small with limited facilities; there is only a small cafe and a ticket office of the Olympic airlines. With a runway length of just over one kilometer, the airport can only handle small 50-seat aircraft.

Airlines and destinations
The following airlines operate regular scheduled and charter flights at Leros Municipal Airport:

Statistics

See also
Transport in Greece

References

External links
 

Airports in Greece
Leros
Buildings and structures in the South Aegean